Chah Mazra (also Romanized as Chāh Mazrā‘) is a village in Sharifabad Rural District, in the Central District of Sirjan County, Kerman Province, Iran. At the 2006 census, its population was 124, in 31 families.

References 

Populated places in Sirjan County